Maty Diop (born 4 January 1988) is a Senegalese footballer who plays as a forward for Kaolack FC and the Senegal women's national team.

International career
Diop capped for Senegal at senior level during the 2012 African Women's Championship.

References

1988 births
Living people
Women's association football forwards
Senegalese women's footballers
Senegal women's international footballers